Lioprosopa neuricella is a species of snout moth in the genus Lioprosopa. It was described by George Hampson in 1918 and is known from Peak Downs, Queensland, Australia.

References

Moths described in 1918
Anerastiini